Frink is a computer programming language. It is, according to creator of the language, "designed to make physical calculations simple, to help ensure that answers come out right, and to make a tool that's really useful in the real world. It tracks units of measure (feet, meters, kilograms, watts, etc.) through all calculations, allowing you to mix units of measure transparently, and helps you easily verify that your answers make sense."

Features 

 units of measure for variables
 Interval arithmetic
 Anonymous functions

Name 

Frink was named after Professor Frink, recurring character in the animated television series The Simpsons.

References

External links 
 
 Frink examples at Rosetta Code

Cross-platform software
Scripting languages
Numerical programming languages
JVM programming languages
Programming languages supporting units of measure
Programming languages created in 2001